Thiru K. Manickam is a member of the 15th Tamil Nadu Legislative Assembly from Sholavandan constituency. Sholavandan legislator K. Manickam is one of the leaders of AIADMK's eleven-member steering committee representatives of Devendrakula Velalar community, which hails from the southern belt. He is a staunch loyalist to AIADMK.

Madurai Kamaraj University's senate
K. Manickam from Sholavandan is among the 4 MLA's from the region nominated to be part of the senate.

References

Indian politicians
Living people
Year of birth missing (living people)
Tamil Nadu MLAs 2016–2021
All India Anna Dravida Munnetra Kazhagam politicians